Marc Shaiman (born October 22, 1959) is an American composer and lyricist for films, television, and theatre, best known for his collaborations with lyricist and director Scott Wittman. He wrote the music and co-wrote the lyrics for the Broadway musical version of the John Waters film Hairspray. He has won a Grammy, an Emmy, and a Tony, and been nominated for seven Oscars.

Personal life
Shaiman was born to a Jewish family in Newark, New Jersey, the son of Claire (née Goldfein) and William Robert Shaiman. He grew up in Scotch Plains, New Jersey and attended Scotch Plains-Fanwood High School, but got his GED and left school at age 16 to start working in New York's theaters. He lives in both Manhattan and upstate New York.

He is openly gay, and married Louis Mirabal, a retired lieutenant commander in the U.S. Navy, on March 26, 2016.

Career
Shaiman started his career as a theatre/cabaret musical director. He started working at Saturday Night Live as an arranger/writer, where he portrayed Skip St. Thomas, the accompanying pianist for The Sweeney Sisters, a singing duo played by Nora Dunn and Jan Hooks, which earned him an Emmy nomination; he returned for an appearance on The Saturday Night Live 40th Anniversary Special, having co-created Martin Short and Maya Rudolph's salute to musical sketch characters. He began his professional relationships with Billy Crystal and Martin Short during his tenure at the show. He also was a vocal arranger for Bette Midler, eventually becoming her musical director and co-producer of many of her recordings, including "The Wind Beneath My Wings" and "From a Distance." He helped create the material for her performance on the penultimate The Tonight Show Starring Johnny Carson. His work with both Midler and Billy Crystal led to his involvement on their films. He later produced Midler's CD It's the Girls, which had the highest debut of Midler's recording career on the Billboard Album charts, and co-wrote Crystal's farewell to Jay Leno which featured Carol Burnett and Oprah Winfrey among others. 

His film credits include Broadcast News, Beaches, When Harry Met Sally..., City Slickers, The Addams Family, Sister Act, Sleepless in Seattle, A Few Good Men, The American President, The First Wives Club, George of the Jungle, In & Out, Patch Adams, South Park: Bigger, Longer & Uncut, Team America: World Police, Hairspray, Flipped, Mary Poppins Returns and HBO's From the Earth to the Moon and 61*. On television, he worked on the final performances for Johnny Carson's Tonight Show (with Bette Midler), Conan O'Brien's Late Night (with Nathan Lane), both of Jay Leno's final Tonight Show broadcasts, and Nathan Lane's farewell to David Letterman called "Dead Inside."

Shaiman has earned seven Academy Award nominations, a Tony Award and a Grammy Award for his work on the musical Hairspray, and an Emmy Award for co-writing Billy Crystal's Academy Award performances. He has also been Grammy-nominated for his arrangements for Harry Connick Jr.'s recordings When Harry Met Sally... and We Are in Love as well as Hairspray and Smash and Emmy-nominated for his work on Saturday Night Live and Smash. In 2002, he was honored with the "Outstanding Achievement in Music-In-Film" award at The Hollywood Film Festival, and in 2007 he was honored with ASCAP's Henry Mancini Award in recognition of his outstanding achievements and contributions to the music of film and television. He is the first recipient of the Film & TV Music Award for Best Score for a Comedy Feature Film. He wrote and sang the song "Yes" for his agent's film Finding Kraftland, and co-wrote (with partner Scott Wittman) songs for Neil Patrick Harris when Harris hosted the 63rd Tony Awards (2009) and the 61st Primetime Emmy Awards (2009), and was Emmy-nominated for musical directing and co-writing the 82nd Academy Awards (2010).

Shaiman co-produced and co-wrote cuts on Mariah Carey's 2010 Christmas album Merry Christmas II You. He and Wittman wrote original songs for the musical-based television show for NBC, Smash, which ran from 2012 to 2013, and served as executive producers. For their song "Let Me Be Your Star," Shaiman and co-lyricist Wittman were nominated for both an Emmy Award and a Grammy Award, and as executive producers they were nominated for the Golden Globe Award for Best Television Series - Comedy or Musical.

Shaiman and Wittman were honored on April 28, 2014, by The New York Pops Orchestra at Carnegie Hall. The following year, Jennifer Hudson sang theSmash song "I Can't Let Go" at the 87th Academy Awards during the in memoriam tribute, featuring revised lyrics. The duo's latest Broadway musical Charlie and the Chocolate Factory ran on Broadway at the Lunt-Fontanne Theatre, after finishing a four-year run on London's West End at The Royal Drury Lane Theater. Shaiman was Tony-nominated for his orchestrations for their previous Broadway musical Catch Me If You Can. In 2021, they wrote a song titled "Save the City" for the Marvel Cinematic Universe (MCU) in-universe Broadway production titled Rogers: The Musical featured in the first episode of Hawkeye, "Never Meet Your Heroes". It was released as a single on November 24, the day the episode became available on Disney+. 

In February 2021, it was announced that Shaiman and Wittman were writing songs for a new musical adaptation of Some Like It Hot, coming to Broadway in 2022 with a book by Amber Ruffin and Matthew Lopez.

Activism
In 2008, a controversy erupted nationwide when California Musical Theatre's then artistic director Scott Eckern resigned over the revelation of his personal donation of $1000 to a political campaign to support California Proposition 8, which was an amendment to change the California Constitution to eliminate the right of same-sex couples to marry in California. After the amendment was passed, donor information became public. Shaiman and other Broadway artists who had previously worked with the director became critical and called for a boycott of the theatre by all gay artists and performers, ending in the director's resignation days later.

To protest the passage of California Proposition 8 in November 2008, Shaiman wrote a satiric mini-musical called Prop 8 — The Musical.  The 3-minute video was distributed on the internet at FunnyOrDie.com, beginning on December 3, 2008. It was written and produced in just a few days. The cast includes Jack Black (who plays Jesus), Neil Patrick Harris, John C. Reilly, Allison Janney, Andy Richter, Maya Rudolph, Margaret Cho, and Rashida Jones. Shaiman plays the piano and appears briefly in the video. It received 1.2 million internet hits in its first day.

Filmography

Films

Television

Theatre

Broadway
Peter Allen: Up in One (1979)
Bette! Divine Madness (1980)
André De Shields' Haarlem Nocturne (1984)
Leader of the Pack (1985)
An Evening with Harry Connick Jr. and Orchestra (1990)
Patti LuPone on Broadway (1995)
Hairspray  †# (2002)
The Odd Couple (2005)
Martin Short: Fame Becomes Me (2006)
Catch Me If You Can † (2009)
Charlie and the Chocolate Factory (2017)
Some Like It Hot (2022)
†  = Tony nominee†# = Tony winner

West End
Charlie and the Chocolate Factory (2013)

Off-Broadway
Dementos - The Production Company
Livin' Dolls - Manhattan Theatre Club
Legends -  Ahmanson Theatre
The Sound of Muzak - Club 82
Trilogy of Terror - Club 57
Non Pasquale - Delacorte Theatre

Internet
Prop 8 - The Musical (2008) (composer, lyricist, pianist) - 2009 "Webby" winner for Best Comedy: Short or Individual Episode
Soundtrack of Our Lives: A Celebration for the Film and TV Music Community ("The End Titles" song) † (2020)
† = Emmy nominee

Discography

Mariah Carey
Merry Christmas II You

Bette Midler
Thighs and Whispers
Mud Will Be Flung Tonight
Some People's Lives
Experience the Divine
Bette
Bathhouse Betty
It's the Girls!

Harry Connick, Jr.
We Are in Love †
† = Grammy nominee

Peter Allen
Making Every Moment Count

Original Broadway cast recordings
Hairspray †# 
Martin Short: Fame Becomes Me
 Catch Me If You Can
 Charlie and the Chocolate Factory the Musical (West End musical)
 Charlie and the Chocolate Factory the Musical (Broadway musical)
† = Grammy nominee†# = Grammy winner

Soundtracks
The Addams Family
The Addams Family Values
Beaches
When Harry Met Sally... † 
 ‘’Heart and Souls’’
For the Boys
City Slickers 
A Few Good Men
Sister Act
Sleepless in Seattle
North
The American President
The Out-of-Towners
South Park: Bigger, Longer & Uncut
Mr. Hankey's Christmas Classics
The Story of Us
Alex & Emma
Rumor Has It…
Hairspray  †
The Bucket List
Smash Season One †
Smash Season Two †
Bombshell
Hairspray Live!
The Star
Mary Poppins Returns  †
† = Grammy nominee

Concert/cabaret work

Peter Allen
Jack Black & Will Ferrell
Kristin Chenoweth
Rosemary Clooney
Harry Connick Jr.
Billy Crystal
Christine Ebersole
Ellen Foley
Whoopi Goldberg
Annie Golden
The Harlettes
 The High-Heeled Women
Lauryn Hill
Jennifer Holliday
Allison Janney
 Laura Kenyon
Nathan Lane
Ute Lemper
Jenifer Lewis
Darlene Love
Patti LuPone
Lypsinka
Ann Magnuson
Andrea Martin
Lonette McKee
Bette Midler
Catherine O'Hara
Sarah Jessica Parker
 Zora Rasmussen
Ann Reinking
Debbie Shapiro Gravitte
Martin Short
Barbra Streisand
Donald Trump
Tracey Ullman
Luther Vandross
Bruce Vilanch
Steven Weber
Raquel Welch
Robin Williams

References

External links

The Marc Shaiman non-official site
The Musical Mind of Marc Shaiman
MusicalTalk Interview with Marc Shaiman

1959 births
20th-century American Jews
20th-century American LGBT people
21st-century American Jews
21st-century LGBT people
American film score composers
American gay musicians
American male film score composers
American male songwriters
American musical theatre composers
American musical theatre lyricists
American television composers
American LGBT songwriters
Animation composers
Broadway composers and lyricists
Grammy Award winners
Jewish American film score composers
Jewish American songwriters
Jewish American television composers
La-La Land Records artists
LGBT film score composers
LGBT people from New Jersey
Gay songwriters
Gay composers
Gay Jews
Light music composers
Living people
Male musical theatre composers
Musicians from Newark, New Jersey
People from Scotch Plains, New Jersey
Primetime Emmy Award winners
Scotch Plains-Fanwood High School alumni
Songwriters from New Jersey
Tony Award winners